White Chuck Cinder Cone is a cinder cone near Glacier Peak in Snohomish County of Washington, USA. Located near the headwaters of the White Chuck River, its existence was first reported by Everett Houghland in 1934.

Based on the amount of glacial erosion on the cinder cone, it is probably between 2,000 and 17,000 years old.

References

External links

Cinder cones of the United States
Cascade Volcanoes
Volcanoes of Washington (state)